Li Tao is a Chinese academic psychiatrist. She is the dean of the Mental Health Center affiliated to Zhejiang University School of Medicine. She is a clinician, professor, and researcher, specialising in topics relating to molecular genetics and mental illness.

Biography 
As a student, Li worked at the National Center for Gene Research, Chinese Academy of Sciences.

From 2008 to 2020, Li was a professor and researcher at West China (Huaxi) Hospital, Sichuan University. She was the leader of the research team there and was on the staff at the Hospital between 1997, when she started as a postdoctoral research worker, and 2020. Li has also taught molecular genetics at Tibet University Medical Science School. As director of the Mental Health Center at West China Hospital, in 2012, she led a collaboration with the University of Massachusetts Medical School in studying tobacco addiction.

Li's work focuses on the genetics of mental illness, especially relating to hereditary schizophrenia. Her work has helped encourage further research into molecular genetics in Western China. She also studies topics relating to Tibet and psychology of the people living there. Her research and contributions have been published in Biological Psychiatry, PLoS, the American Journal of Medical Genetics, The American Journal of Psychiatry, Nature, The British Journal of Psychiatry, and Psychiatry Research.

References

External links
Li Tao's page at Zhejiang University
Li Tao's page at West China Hospital

Living people
Chinese psychologists
Chinese women psychologists
Chinese women scientists
Chinese geneticists
Academic staff of Sichuan University
Sichuan University alumni
1965 births
Women psychiatrists
Women geneticists